The Ohio Business Development Coalition (OBDC) is a nonprofit trade association that encourages businesses to move to or stay in Ohio, United States.  It is funded with a combination of public and private sector funds.  The stated primary objective of the OBDC is to provide the Ohio Department of Development, the state's regional economic development organizations and chambers both qualified leads and effective tools to retain and expand Ohio companies, and attract new companies to Ohio.

The OBDC website includes "Ohio InSite", a database of cities and industrial parks within Ohio, with economic and business data, sites and buildings, and detailed information for Ohio industries.

Awards and Honors
Site Selection Magazine, a location assistance publication, has awarded the state of Ohio its fourth consecutive Governor’s Cup Award for leading the nation in new and expanded facilities in 2009.

The "Why Ohio" advertising campaign was noted by the business and advertising communities.  

Other awards include:
 The Communicator Awards (2008)
 PRSA: Award of Excellence (2008 – Non-profit Website)
 Web Marketing Association: Web Award (2008 Government Standard of Excellence)
 The American Business Awards: The Stevies (2007 – Best Magazine Campaign)
 IEDC: Excellence in Economic Development Awards (2007 – Best Advertising Campaign)

Staff
The OBDC staff includes: Ed Burghard, executive director; Marlon Cheatham, brand manager; Matt McQuade, sales manager; and Kristi Tanner, brand manager.

See also
 Ohio Third Frontier
 Outline of Ohio
 Site Selection magazine

External links
 Ohio Business Gateway
 Ohio Department of Development
 Ohio InSite
 Ohio Third Frontier
 State of Ohio

References

Organizations based in Ohio
Trade associations based in the United States